At least two ships of the Hellenic Navy have borne the name Apostolis after Greek naval hero Nikolis Apostolis:

 , a  launched in 1940 as HMS Hyacinth and transferred to Greece and renamed in 1943. She was scrapped in 1952.
 , a  launched in 1945 as USS Charles P. Cecil she was transferred to Greece in 1980 and renamed. She was scrapped in 2003.

Hellenic Navy ship names